Darren Clarke  is an Irish sportsperson. He played Gaelic football with his local club St Mary's before joining Dublin side St Sylvester's. He has been a member of the senior Louth county team since 2004. He was part of the team hat lined out in the 2006 Tommy Murphy Cup.

References
 http://hoganstand.com/Louth/ArticleForm.aspx?ID=92832

Year of birth missing (living people)1987
Living people
Louth inter-county Gaelic footballers
St Mary's (Louth) Gaelic footballers
St Sylvester's Gaelic footballers